Science & Justice is a peer-reviewed scientific journal of forensics published by Elsevier on behalf of the Forensic Science Society and the International Society for Forensic Genetics. The journal was established in 1960 as the Journal of the Forensic Science Society and obtained its current name in 1995.

One notable article was an analysis of the assassination of John F. Kennedy, which disputed the conclusion of the 1982 United States National Academy of Sciences report that the House Select Committee on Assassinations finding of a fourth shot in acoustical evidence was incorrect. A later article re-analyzed the acoustic synchronization evidence, rebutting this argument as well as correcting errors in the 1982 report, while supporting its finding that the sounds alleged to be gunshots occurred about a minute after the assassination. Follow-up Science & Justice articles have been published, too.

References

External links 
 
 Forensic Science Society
 International Society for Forensic Genetics

Criminology journals
Elsevier academic journals
Quarterly journals
Publications established in 1960
English-language journals